Worthville is a borough in Jefferson County, Pennsylvania, United States. The population was sixty-seven at the time of the 2010 census, a decline from the figure of eighty-five, which had been tabulated in 2000. 

The borough is named for General William Jenkins Worth, and is the smallest municipality in Jefferson County.

History
Worthville was originally called "Geistown", and under the latter name, was laid out by Daniel Geist, and then named for him. 

The name was changed to Worthville in 1854.

Notable person
Jimmy Slagle, Major League Baseball player, was born in Worthville.

Geography
Worthville is located in southwestern Jefferson County at  (41.027404, -79.139289). It is situated in the valley of Little Sandy Creek, a west-flowing tributary of Redbank Creek and part of the Allegheny River watershed.

Demographics

As of the census of 2000, there were eighty-five people, thirty-one households and twenty-four families residing in the borough. 

The population density was 463.6 people per square mile (182.3/km2). 

There were thirty-five housing units at an average density of 190.9 per square mile (75.1/km2). The racial makeup of the borough was 95.29% White, and 4.71% from two or more races.

Of the thirty-one households, 35.5% had children under the age of eighteen living with them, 67.7% were married couples living together, 12.9% had a female householder with no husband present, and 19.4% were non-families. 12.9% of all households were made up of individuals, and 6.5% had someone living alone who was sixty-five years of age or older. The average household size was 2.74 and the average family size was 2.88.

In the borough, the population was spread out, with 28.2% under the age of eighteen, 4.7% from eighteen to twenty-four, 28.2% from twenty-five to forty-four, 20.0% from forty-five to sixty-four, and 18.8% who were sixty-five years of age or older. The median age was thirty-six years. 

For every one hundred females there were 102.4 males. For every one hundred females aged eighteen and over, there were 96.8 males.

The median income for a household in the borough was $35,625, and the median income for a family was $28,750. Males had a median income of $23,958 versus $16,875 for females. The per capita income for the borough was $14,542. 

There were no families and 2.2% of the population living below the poverty line, including no under eighteen and none of those over sixty-four.

References

Populated places established in 1878
Boroughs in Jefferson County, Pennsylvania
1878 establishments in Pennsylvania